Canta Comigo (English: Sing with Me) is a Brazilian reality television music competition show based on the British television series All Together Now.

The series is known for being the final show Gugu Liberato hosted prior to his death on November 21, 2019. Rodrigo Faro, who had already hosted the first season of the teen series in 2020, replaced Gugu as the main series host in 2021.

Format
In each episode, a range of singers take to the stage, but waiting to judge each performance is 'The 100' - a unique panel of one hundred music experts and performers from across Brazil.

The heats
During each heat, performers try and outscore their competitors in order to earn a seat on the top three podium. Whenever a performer scores high enough for a podium place, the act in 3rd place is eliminated as a result.

From each heat, two acts go through to the semifinals. Once all acts have sung, the 1st placed performer with the highest score automatically goes through. The acts in 2nd and 3rd sing off against one another and the winner of that sing off earns the second qualification spot.

If, at any time, someone reaches the maximum score and makes the 100 judges stand up at once ensures a direct place for the grand finale. This can happen at any time in the program, either in the heats or in the semifinal.

The sing-off
For the sing-off at the end of the show, scores are reset to zero and the 2nd and 3rd placed acts perform a new song chosen from a given shortlist. In the event that both acts wish to sing the same song from that shortlist, the performer in 2nd place has priority.

The semifinals, the final and the prize
In the semifinals, the qualified candidates in the heats are resubmitted to the 100 judges in new performances seeking the final spots in the finale.

In the final, the finalists perform again in front of The 100 with a new song. This time, all three acts who finish in the top three podium seats sing again and the act with the most public votes after this final sing off wins the season and with it the R$300.000 cash prize.

Series overview

The 100
The 100 are a range of music experts and performers from across the Brazil. They were cast to include a diverse mix of ages, backgrounds and a variety of music genres.

Ratings and reception

Brazilian ratings
All numbers are in points and provided by Kantar Ibope Media.

References

External links
 Canta Comigo on R7.com

2018 Brazilian television series debuts
Brazilian reality television series
Portuguese-language television shows
RecordTV original programming
All Together Now (franchise)
Brazilian television series based on British television series